Dukhovskoye is a rural locality (a selo) in Kuropatinsky Selsoviet of Tambovsky District, Amur Oblast, Russia. The population was 94 as of 2018. There are 3 streets.

Geography 
Dukhovskoye is located 40 km southwest of Tambovka (the district's administrative centre) by road. Kuropatino is the nearest rural locality.

References 

Rural localities in Tambovsky District, Amur Oblast